Liushuquan is a town in Fengnan County, Tangshan, Hebei near the coast of the Bo Sea to the immediate northeast of the Port of Tianjin and the immediate northwest of the Port of Tangshan Caofeidian. Liushuquan Town is named after a village (which is now divided into three villages) founded in the northern part of the town in 1662. Liushuquan has a reputation as a "land of fish and rice where you can easily find a Holocentridae fish or a Tianjin Purple Crab".

Overview
Liushuquan Town has advantageous geography, location, transportation and natural resources as well as a history of settlement stretching back to the Ming Dynasty. The town has a total cultivated land area of 75000 mu as well as 11000 mu of water-based agriculture. The town is located in the coastal plain of the Bo Sea, 24 km from Tangshan. The town is north of G0111 Qinhuangdao–Binzhou Expressway. Fengjian road runs through the middle of the town from north to south. Hejian road, QiuLiu highways cross through the town. There are four rivers, Dadou River, Sand River, Dongpaigan and Xipaigan which flow into the Bo Sea.

The town has been mentioned as an example of the usage of the character 𨟠 (瞿阝quān) in several editions of the Contemporary Chinese Dictionary. There are several sources which give the pronunciation quàn for this character.

History

Ming Dynasty

Zhengde
In 1506 (the first year of the Zhengde era 正德元年), the Xihe (West River) village was established. The village is named after the shallow river to the west of the village.  The West River itself is so named because it is west of the Dadou River.  According to tradition, the West River was formerly a canal that reached Beijing. The village was originally named Xihedian (West River Store 西河店).

Qing Dynasty

Shunzhi
In 1644, the villages of Liu De Zhuang and Xiaxin Zhuang were established around the collapse of the Ming Dynasty. Liu De Zhuang takes its name from Liu De, a member of the Ming court who left the capital and took residence in the area. Xiaxin Zhuang was established in the same year to the south of Liu De Zhuang. Its name derives from reference to the depressed land around the Bo Sea.

In 1650, the village of Hanjiaquan (Han Family Quan) was established on the western bank of the Dadou River. Its name derives from settlers of the Han family, and reference to the geographical feature 'quan'.

Kangxi
In 1662 (the first year of the Kangxi era 清康熙元年), the village of Liushuquan (Willow Tree Quan) for which the town of Liushuquan is named was established by migrants from Hangu, Tianjin (present-day Binhai) who planted willow trees on the border of their village. This village was later divided into Liushuquan Bei (North Liushuquan), Liushuquan Dong (East Liushuquan) and Liushuquan Qian.

In 1671 (the tenth year of the Kangxi era 康熙十年), Jimen was established on the western bank of the Dadou River.

In 1682 (the twenty first year of the Kangxi era 康熙二十一年), Laopu was established on the eastern bank of the Dadou River. Laopu's name references the old pu of settler Li Hongshen.

Qianlong

In 1736 (the first year of the Qianlong era 清乾隆元年), Li Fu Zhuang was established to the southwest of Liu De Zhuang. The name of the village is derived from the Li family and the rich natural resources of the village.

In 1755 (the twentieth year of the Qianlong era 清乾隆二十年), Aoli (廒里 Áolǐ) was established south of Jimen on the Dadou River. The village's name is derived from the practice of boiling seawater (熬盐 áoyán) which is a homophone of áo 廒.

People's Republic of China

In 1954, Laopu Township was established.

In August 1958, Laopu Township was made into a people's commune.

In 1968, Sangou (三沟 Third Channel) was established. The area was originally part of a marsh which was divided into four channels. Settlers from nearby Jimen migrated east to the former location of the third channel, and their new village used the name of the former channel.

In 1982, the name of Laopu Commune was changed to Liushuquan Commune.

In 1984, Liushuquan Commune was changed into a township().

In 1985, Liushuquan Township was elevated to a town.

In 1997, it had a total area of 103 km2, a population of 25,000, and was made up of 18 village-level() divisions.

In 2005, Qianjin (Progress), Dongfeng (Eastern Wind),and Hongxing (Red Star) were combined into First West River Village. Xiangyang and Shengli were combined into Second West River Village. Hongqi and Yonghong were combined into Third West River Village.

Geography

Administrative divisions
There are 14 (previously 18) villages in Liushuquan:

Demographics

References

Tangshan
Bohai Sea